Ivan Pešić (born 17 March 1989) is a Croatian handball goalkeeper for HBC Nantes and the Croatian national team.

The first few years as a player played Pešić in his hometown Rijeka in RK Zamet and with production license in Croatian second division club RK Senj. He then played for the Hungarian club MKB Veszprém KC, with which he won in the 2008/09 season, league and cup, as well as the Croatian first division club RK Zagreb, with whom he won three times the double. In 2012 he joined the Slovenian club RK Maribor Branik . After one season, he signed with the Belarusian club HC Meshkov Brest, with whom he again champion and cup winner was, 2014.

At a dance hall in February 2009 some hungarians people attacked Pešić and teammate Marin Cozma with a knife. Pešić was so badly injured by a knife that he had to remove a kidney. His teammate Marian Cozma died after two stab wounds to the heart, another colleague, Žarko Šešum, suffered skull fractures due to heavy kicks to the head.

Even though Pešić was an unseen substitute at the 2009 World Men's Handball Championship in Croatia he still won a medal.

Pešić has played for Croatia at the 2011 World Championship, 2013 Mediterranean Games and has recently been called up for the 2016 Summer Olympics qualification tournament

Honours
Zamet II
3. HRL - West: 2004-05
Croatian Championship U-18 runner-up: 2008

Veszprém
Hungarian Premier League: 2008–09
Magyar Cup: 2009

Zagreb
Dukat Premier League: 2009–10, 2010–11, 2011–12
Croatian Cup: 2010, 2011, 2012

Meshkov Brest
Belarusian First League: 2013–14, 2014–15, 2015–16, 2016-17
Belarusian Cup: 2014, 2015, 2016, 2017
SEHA League runner-up: 2013–14, 2014–15

Individual
Dražen Petrović Award - 2007

References

1989 births
Living people
Croatian male handball players
Handball players from Rijeka
Handball players at the 2016 Summer Olympics
Olympic handball players of Croatia
RK Zamet players
RK Zagreb players
Veszprém KC players
Expatriate handball players
Croatian expatriate sportspeople in Hungary
Croatian expatriate sportspeople in Slovenia
Mediterranean Games silver medalists for Croatia
Competitors at the 2013 Mediterranean Games
Mediterranean Games medalists in handball